Chiffonade is a slicing technique in which leafy green vegetables such as spinach, sorrel, or Swiss chard, or a flat-leaved herb like basil, are cut into long, thin strips. This is accomplished by stacking leaves, rolling them tightly, then slicing the leaves perpendicular to the roll. The technique can also be applied to thin crepes or omelets to produce strips.

This technique is not suited to small, narrow, or irregularly shaped herb leaves such as coriander, parsley, thyme, or rosemary. It requires a consistent, flat surface area for the knife to accomplish the ribbons.

"Chiffonade" means little ribbons in French, referring to the little ribbons formed from finely cutting the leaves in this technique.

See also
Brunoise
Julienning

References

External links

Chiffonade
Article describing chiffonade of omelet to add to soup

Cutting techniques (cooking)
Culinary terminology